SWSC may refer to:
 Southwest Suburban Conference, a high school athletic conference in Illinois, US
 Secret World of Santa Claus, a children's television show
 Southern Whaling and Sealing Company, a British whaling company (1911–1941)
 Schlumberger Well Surveying Corporation, a company started by the Schlumberger brothers